Ganavan is a small settlement on Ganavan Bay on the west coast of Scotland, around  north of the town of Oban.

References

Seaside resorts in Scotland
Villages in Argyll and Bute